Gugarchinak (also Romanized as Gūgarchīnak, Googar Chīnak, and Govarchīnak; also known as Gohār Chānak, Gowgarchīnīk, and Gūrchīnak) is a village in Shivanat Rural District, Afshar District, Khodabandeh County, Zanjan Province, Iran. At the 2006 census, its population was 738, in 168 families.

References 

Populated places in Khodabandeh County